American Abstract Artists (AAA) was formed in 1936 in New York City, to promote and foster public understanding of abstract art. American Abstract Artists exhibitions, publications, and lectures helped to establish the organization as a major forum for the exchange and discussion of ideas, and for presenting abstract art to a broader public. The American Abstract Artists group contributed to the development and acceptance of abstract art in the United States and has a historic role in its avant-garde. It is one of the few artists’ organizations to survive from the Great Depression and continue into the 21st century.

History

During the 1930s, abstract art was viewed with critical opposition and there was little support from art galleries and museums. The American Abstract Artists group was established in 1936 as a forum for discussion and debate of abstract art and to provide exhibition opportunities when few other possibilities existed. In 1937 AAA issued a “General Prospectus.” It outlined the purpose of the organization and the importance of exhibitions in promoting the growth and acceptance of abstract art in the United States.

AAA held its first exhibition in 1937 at the Squibb Gallery in New York City. This was the most extensive and widely attended exhibition of American abstract painting and sculpture outside of a museum during the 1930s. For the 1937 exhibition AAA produced its first print portfolio of original zinc plate lithographs, instead of documenting the exhibit with a catalog. Future exhibitions and publications would establish AAA as a major forum for the discussion and presentation of new abstract and non-objective art.

The most influential critics dismissed American abstract art as too European and therefore “un-American”. There was extensive hostile criticism of AAA exhibits in New York City newspapers and art magazines of the time.  American abstract art was struggling to win acceptance and AAA personified this. The 1938 Yearbook addressed criticisms levied against abstract art by the press and public. It also featured essays related to principles behind and the practice of making abstract art. In 1940, AAA printed a broadside titled “How Modern is the Museum of Modern Art?” which was handed out at a protest in front of MOMA. At the time the Museum of Modern Art had a policy of featuring European abstraction while endorsing American regionalism and scene painting. This policy helped entrench the notion that abstraction was foreign to the American experience.

Later that year AAA produced a 12-page pamphlet: “The Art Critics – ! How Do They Serve the Public? What Do They Say? How Much Do They Know? Let’s Look at the Record.” The AAA publication quoted critics, highlighting misstatements and contradictions in the press.  The pamphlet excoriated notable New York Herald Tribune critic Royal Cortissoz for his rigid loyalty to traditionalism, his patent distaste for abstract and modern art, and generally for what the pamphlet regarded as his "resistance to knowledge".  It also characterized the aesthetic vacillations of Thomas Craven, critic of the New York American, as opportunistic.  In 1936, Craven labeled Picasso's work "Bohemian infantilism".  The ensuing years would see a growing public appreciation for abstract art until, in 1939, the critic made an about-face and lauded Picasso for his "unrivaled inventiveness".  The pamphlet applauded Henry McBride of the New York Sun and Robert Coates of the New Yorker for their critical efforts regarding abstract art.  "The Art Critics" showed the lack of knowledge the critics from New York City newspapers and art publications had about developments in 20th-century art.

AAA combated prevailing hostile attitudes toward abstraction and prepared the way for its acceptance after World War II. AAA was a precursor to abstract expressionism by helping abstract art discover its identity in the United States.

During the early 1940s the New York School gained momentum and throughout the mid-1940s and 1950s Abstract Expressionism dominated the American avant-garde. American Abstract Artists continued its mandate as an advocate for abstract art.

American Abstract Artists is active today. To date the organization has produced over 75 exhibitions of its membership in museums and galleries across the United States.  AAA has published 5 Journals, in addition to brochures, books, catalogs, and has hosted critical panels and symposia.  AAA distributes its published materials internationally to cultural organizations. American Abstract Artist produces print portfolios by its membership. AAA print portfolios are in the collections of the Whitney Museum of American Art, Museum of Modern Art, Tate in London, and the Archives of American Art.

In 2014  Harry Holtzman and George L.K. Morris,  founding members of the American Abstract Artists were paired  in an intimate 2-man exhibit, curated by Kinney Frelinghuysen  and Madalena Holtzman, and designed to evoke an informal conversation between the two artists. This exhibition marked also the beginning of a collaboration between the Estates of George L.K. Morris and Harry Holtzman, with support of the Netherlands Institute for Art History. The collaboration aims at sharing, editing and exhibiting new historical materials related and connected to the world of abstract art of the seminal period of the 1930s and 1940s in Europe and in the USA. For this reason in this first show will be present also the works of other European protagonists of the time like Jean Hélion, Cesar Domela, and Ben Nicholson.
A project, that duly enlarged and in the details curated will be evolving into a wider exhibition initiative.

Founding members
The following artists are considered founding members:

Footnotes

References 
 American Abstract Artists, The Language of Abstraction, exhibition catalog. Betty Parsons Gallery, Marilyn Pearl Gallery, 1979. Text by Susan Larson.
 Larsen, Susan C. “The American Abstract Artists: A Documentary History 1936–1941”, Archives of American Art Journal, Vol. 14, No. 1 (1974), p 2-7.
 Pioneers of Abstract Art: American Abstract Artists, 1936–1996, exhibition catalog. Sidney Mishkin Gallery, Baruch College, 1996. Text by Sandra Kraskin.
 Continuum: In Celebration of the 70th Anniversary of AAA, exhibition press release. St. Peter's College Art Gallery, O'Toole Library, Jersey City, NJ (March 21 – April 25, 2007).

External links
American Abstract Artists
American Abstract Artists records, 1935–1982 in the collection of the Archives of American Art

American artist groups and collectives
Arts organizations based in New York City
Abstract art
Abstract expressionism
American contemporary art
American art movements
Arts organizations established in 1936
1936 establishments in the United States